Ebenezer Moses Debrah is a retired Ghanaian diplomat. He served as Ghana's ambassador to Ethiopia the United States of America, and Ghana's High Commissioner to the United Kingdom and Australia from 1963 to 1980.

Early life and education 
Debrah was born on 9 July 1928 at Koforidua in the Eastern Region of Ghana (then Gold Coast). He had his secondary education at Mfantsipim School and Achimota School where he obtained his Cambridge School Leaving Certificate in 1950. After a short spell of teaching at Abuakwa State College, he enrolled at the University College of the Gold Coast (now the University of Ghana) in 1951, where he was awarded his Bachelor of Arts degree in history in 1954. In 1955 he studied at the London School of Economics and Political Science.

Career 
Following his studies at the University College of the Gold Coast, Debrah joined the Gold Coast Civil Service as an Assistant Publications Officer in the Information Services Department. He was a member of the first selected officers that formed the nucleus of the foreign cadet who were trained abroad to steer Ghana's Foreign Missions when Ghana attained independence. After his studies at the London School of Economics, he served as an Assistant to the Secretary of the Ministry of Defence and External Affairs. Following Ghana's independence, Debrah was posted to the Ghana Embassy in Monrovia, Liberia as its first Secretary. In 1959, he served in that same capacity in the Embassy of Ghana in Cairo, Egypt (then the United Arab Republic). A year later, he worked as a Counselor at the Embassy of Ghana in Washington, D.C., U.S.A. In 1962, he returned to Ghana to serve as the Director in Charge of Asia and Middle East Affairs at the Ministry of Foreign Affairs.

In 1965, Debrah was appointed  Ambassador Extraordinary and Plenipotentiary of Ghana to Ethiopia. He served in that same capacity until 1967 when he was appointed Ghana's ambassador to the United States of America. in 1972, he returned to Ghana to serve as Supervising Principal Secretary in the Ministry of Foreign Affairs. In December 1973, he was made Secretary to the National Redemption Council and to the Supreme Military Council when it was established in October 1975. In 1977 Debrah was appointed Ghana's High Commissioner to Australia and a year later, Ghana's High Commissioner to the United Kingdom. He held this appointment until 1980.

Publications 
In his lifetime, Debrah has authored various articles that have been published in journals and published books. Some of which include;
Will Most Uncommitted National Remain Uncommitted? published in the American Academy of Political and Science Journal (July 1961)
Understanding Ghana published in the Social Science, National Academy of Economics and Political Science Journal (1966)
The Psychology of African Nationalism published in New Voices of Africa, Georgetown University, U.S.A.

Honours 

 Debrah was awarded an honorary doctorate degree in law (LLD) by various American Universities, in recognition of his contribution towards the strengthening of Ghana-America relations.
 In 2019, he was honoured by the government of Ghana for his "contributions towards advancing and promoting the image of the country".

References 

1928 births
Ambassadors of Ghana to the United States
Alumni of Achimota School
Ghanaian diplomats
Mfantsipim School alumni
Alumni of the London School of Economics
University of Ghana alumni
Ambassadors of Ghana to Ethiopia
High Commissioners of Ghana
High Commissioners of Ghana to Australia
High Commissioners of Ghana to the United Kingdom
People from Eastern Region (Ghana)
People from Koforidua
Living people